Abdulkadir Koçak (born 1 January 1981) is a Turkish national boxer competing in the light flyweight (48 kg) division. Koçak boxed for Beşiktaş J.K. before transferring to Tekelspor club in Istanbul.

Kocak won gold medal at the inaugural European Union Boxing Championship held 2003 in Strasbourg, France. He was named "Best Boxer" amongst the 91 boxers from 17 different countries who took part at the championship. He fought a bronze medal at the 2004 World University Boxing Championship in Antalya, Turkey. Koçak won bronze medal in his weight class at the 2005 Mediterranean Games in Almería, Spain.

References

1981 births
Living people
Light-flyweight boxers
Turkish male boxers
European champions for Turkey
Mediterranean Games gold medalists for Turkey
Mediterranean Games bronze medalists for Turkey
Competitors at the 2001 Mediterranean Games
Competitors at the 2005 Mediterranean Games
Mediterranean Games medalists in boxing
21st-century Turkish people
20th-century Turkish people